Burnistoun is a Scottish comedy sketch show broadcast by BBC Scotland, written by the comedians Iain Connell and Robert Florence. The show was produced by The Comedy Unit.

The series is set in a fictional Scottish town called Burnistoun in the greater Glasgow area. Characters include Kelly McGlade, Burnistoun's answer to Beyoncé; Paul and Walter, the disturbingly odd brothers that run an ice cream van; Jolly Boy John, who tells the things that make him "For Real" to the accompaniment of a happy hardcore soundtrack; McGregor and Toshan (the "quality polis"), best friends Scott and Peter and the Burnistoun Butcher, a serial killer who is unhappy with the way he is being portrayed by the media. The town's name is derived from the Springburn and Dennistoun areas of Glasgow, where Florence and Connell, respectively, grew up.

Connell and Florence have previously written sitcoms Empty and Legit, and created characters for Chewin' the Fat and The Karen Dunbar Show.

The third and final series started filming in January 2012 and began its run in August 2012, ending in September.

Broadcast
The pilot was broadcast by BBC Two Scotland on 25 February 2009 and repeated on 29 March 2010. On 20, 22, and 25 January 2010, audience reaction screenings were shown at the Odeon Cinema, Springfield Quay, Glasgow, where approximately 240 minutes of unfinalized sketches (missing music, sound effects, and visual effects) were shown to assist the production team in their choice of material for the forthcoming series. The first episode of series one aired on 1 March 2010 at 10 pm on BBC Two Scotland.

Burnistoun ran for three series from 2010 to 2012. Each series contained six episodes for a total of eighteen episodes. Each episode ran for thirty minutes, composed of various unconnected sketches with a few running gags and characters (see below). There have been further one-off episodes: Burnistoun's Big Night on 17 July 2015, Burnistoun Goes to Work on Christmas 2016, and Burnistoun Tunes In, shown at the launch of the BBC Scotland channel on 24 February 2019, nearly 10 years to the day the first episode was broadcast.

Recurring characters and situations
Scott and Peter: Scott (Florence) and Peter (Connell) are two friends that live in the town. The two frequently argue, often over things Scott thinks Peter to be strange or embarrassing. Scott and Peter are among the only characters to have been used throughout the show's run.
Kelly McGlade and the Sloppy Seconds: An aspiring girl band, led by namesake Kelly McGlade (Florence), along with two other girls, Carly (Kirsty Strain) and Emma (Louise Stewart). Sketches with the band frequently feature the aggressive and hot-tempered Kelly getting into fights with her detractors or chastising and bullying Carly and Emma. Her catchphrase was a loud and indignant "Excuse me?!" Kelly was killed off in the final episode of the first season by the town's murderer, the Burnistoun Butcher, as she was under the impression that he would be her new manager. In the pilot, she was the original "Jackie McGlade" and the name of her band was "Snide Rides".
DJ Jesus: A recurring gag in the first series only, where a series of everyday sounds are created in a pattern by people. The camera then pans up to reveal that Jesus (Connell) is creating the pattern by DJing. He is then caught and told off by his father, God (Florence).
The Burnistoun Herald: The town's newspaper. Many sketches of varying topics are set in the headquarters of the paper, often centered around the bumbling, technologically challenged editor (Florence).
 Paul and Walter: Paul (Connell) and Walter (Florence) are two seventeen-year-old brothers who constantly argue whilst running the ice-cream van. Paul is the more mature one and is often exasperated with Walter's behavior. He is a parental figure, even though they are both seventeen. Walter, conversely, is very childish, usually acting like a five-year-old. He often uses the word "anyway" as a form of punctuation. The two frequently get into trouble for insulting their customers or getting into petty fights right in front of them. The ashes of the brothers' dead "mammy" are frequently brought up. The boys' father is never mentioned. After being used extensively in Series 1 and the first part of Series 2, they were killed off when their van rolled into the ocean.
 The Burnistoun Butcher: A town murderer (Connell) that is deeply upset and frustrated with how he is portrayed by the media and is often confused with an actual butcher (Florence). He is last seen in season 2 locked up in Doberman Man's holding cells, still being confused with the actual butcher.
MC Hottie Boxtrot (Richard Rankin): A hip-hop artist from the town; he once controversially called Burnistoun a "shithole" on public radio.
Burnistoun DJ: The town's DJ (Connell), is frequently annoyed by the odd guests (often played by Florence) that appear on his show.
Jolly Boy John: A young man (Connell) who makes videos of himself doing strange things in his room 'FOR REAL.'
Alex Ciderson: Another character who was kept throughout the run of the series, Alex Ciderson (Florence) is the head of his eponymous company. The Alex Ciderson company sells a variety of things, many of which are strange or pointless, such as a scarecrow used for scaring away teenagers (which doubles as a sex toy), a large plastic jaw mask used to conceal a person's braces, and clones of Alex himself. In the show, Alex Ciderson is always seen in commercials for his products. He speaks in a high-pitched, reedy voice.
Biscuity Boyle: A washed-up former athlete (Florence) who is now overweight and in poor condition. Biscuity Boyle's sketches often see him promoting his endeavours or trying to win people's respect by calling himself "Burnistoun's favourite son". However, his clumsiness and social awkwardness always follow him, and sketches usually see him accidentally farting in somebody's face, with his trousers falling shortly afterward.
The Quality Polis: MacGregor (Connell) and Toshan (Florence) are two bumbling, immature policemen, who, despite always referring to themselves as "quality polis", often make the situations they are investigating worse. At one time, they were suspended for their misconduct.
 James Jumpstyle: A character (Florence) who advertises for certain services (hardware, delivery, and funeral services) to jumpstyle music and ends up creating problems through his energetic dancing.
Doberman Man: The town's superhero, Doberman Man (Florence) was once a chubby young boy who was bitten by a Doberman, turning him into a crime fighter. He is constantly haunted by his archenemy and nemesis, Big Sanny Tolan's boy (Connell), who had teased him for being a virgin in school. A clear parody of the popular superhero, Batman.
Joe and Barry: Two working-class men (Connell and Florence) in a same-sex relationship who are always worried about going places and doing things that appeal to a specific demographic outside their own. Sketches often end with them saying that they'll go "up 'eh road." This gag was used in the third series.
Burnistoun Kilty Club: A parody of The White Heather Club. Harry MacLauderie (Florence) sings various songs in "braid Scots" at the Kilty Club, before switching to standard English for the last line, which is always about a famous current celebrity or pop culture phenomenon.
Scottish History with Robert Clach: A documentary presenter (Connell) who frequently re-enacts Scottish battles, often attacking unsuspecting people admiring the local scenery. Due to his long hair and energetic style, Robert Clach is often thought to be a parody of Scottish historical documentary presenter Neil Oliver.
The Best Friends: Two men (Connell and Florence) where one brings up a simple thing only for the both of them to descend to bickering and insulting one another, even with them then shouting at each other with one of them (Florence) taking it too far and then ending it with a loud and distressed "I HATE YOU!". It ends with the other man (Connell) getting upset and trying to remind each other of their friendship, usually through some sort of gift with a word referencing it but is always misspelled (such as having their faces on the back of a skateboard with the words "LEDGENS" instead of "LEGENDS") until leaving, with the other one (Florence) slowly whimpering, apparently showing regret of what he had just done.

Live show 
In March 2015, Connell and Florence created a live stage show based on Burnistoun, entitled Burnistoun: Live and For Real. The show, held at the Kings Theatre in Glasgow, featured Connell and Florence, supported by series regulars Louise Stewart and Gerry McLaughlin, bringing to life sketches and beloved characters such as the Quality Polis and Jolly Boy John. The show generated a very positive response from both fans and critics, and due to its success, more shows were scheduled for August 2015. The show also played at the 2016 Edinburgh Festival Fringe.

References

External links
 

2009 Scottish television series debuts
BBC Scotland television sketch shows
Scottish television sitcoms
BBC Scotland television shows
2012 Scottish television series endings
2000s Scottish television series
2010s Scottish television series
Television series by Banijay
Television shows set in Glasgow
2000s British television sketch shows
2010s British television sketch shows
Scots-language mass media